This article is written from a predominantly Netherlands viewpoint – neglecting much of the Belgian (Flanders) scene, let alone Dutch- or mixed-language rap/hip hop in the Caribbean parts of the Kingdom of the Netherlands, nor Suriname!

Dutch hip hop or Nederhop ("Netherhop"), is hip hop / rap music created by Dutch speaking musicians in the Netherlands and Flanders (Belgium). Although the first Dutch speaking rappers in Europe typically worked in English, this began to change after 1986, at first in an underground scene. The Osdorp Posse were the first to record and release Dutch language hip hop singles, from around 1990, but it took until 1995 for a Dutch language rap single to achieve a main chart top ten hit: Spraakwater by Extince.

After rapper Def Rhymz achieved the first Dutch main chart top-1 hits with Doekoe (Sranan Tongo for 'money'; 1999), and Schudden ("Shake (it)"/"Shaking"; 2001), Dutchlanguage hip hop has grown into a staple of mainstream pop music in the Netherlands and Flanders in the 21st century.

In 2021, Netherlands music streaming charts are dominated by Dutch rap music artists like Boef, Josylvio, Broederliefde, Lil' Kleine, Snelle, and Sevn Alias.

History

1980s

Between 1980 and 1985 a few Dutch Hip Hop records had already been released, but in 1986 Dutch rap duo MC Miker G & DJ Sven had a top 10 hit in at least ten countries, across Europe with their Holiday Rap, which sampled Madonna's Holiday, and caused notable financial disputes, four years ahead of Vanilla Ice's similar sampling troubles with Ice Ice Baby. That same year Dutch rapper Extince released his first record: Rap Around The Clock; in 1987 he scored a modest hit with The Milkshake Rap.

However, in the late 1980s Nederhop ("Netherhop") emerged, as artists began to rap in Dutch, such as Def Rhymz, Blonnie B, Alex and the CityCrew, Dynamic Rockers, and the Osdorp Posse. Though there is disagreement about who were the first, the pioneers' work was at first only experimental, except for the Osdorp Posse, a group from Osdorp, a "hood" in Amsterdam, who were first to release tracks in Dutch, for instance the single Moordenaar ("Murderer") in 1989, marking a beginning milestone of Nederhop. After their frontman, rapper Def P, began by literally translating English raps into Dutch, he started writing original work that still contained peculiar idioms that resulted from his earlier literal rewordings. The result was described by rapper Ali B as highly visual and captivating. Once Extince switched to Dutch in 1994, having rapped in English since 1984, both he and Osdorp Posse became highly influential in Nederhop in the 1990s and beyond.

Notable in the late 1980s were All Star Fresh of King Bee topping charts with: "Back by Dope Demand" in early 1990 and Rudeboy of Urban Dance Squad who, at the time, were arguably more widely known in New York City than in the Netherlands. DJ and Producer All Star Fresh turned professional as early as 1979. After winning the Dutch Mixing Championships (DMC) in 1988, he was invited for The World Mix Championships in the London Royal Hall and won third place among strong competition. He was invited by Dave Funkenklein to enter the lion's den in New York. He made history in the Big Apple of Hiphop by being the first non -American to fly into the finals of The World Supremacy Battle of DJs. He gained the highly respected second place of this prestigious DJ contest). The impression that he made that year, resulted in many invitations to perform with world known artists like Public Enemy, Stetsasonic, Ice T and Ultra Magnetic MCs.

All Star Fresh. As performer and producer he is better known as KING BEE. With his second floor filler Back By Dope Demand he achieved one of his biggest hiphop hits. In the Netherlands it resulted in a Top 3 position, and best Dance Product by The Edison Awards in the Netherlands. (The Edison Awards is an award by the Dutch Music Industry.) This also meant that with this title, he was the first black artist to win this award in the Netherlands. After that he appeared as supporting act for Madonnas show in the Netherlands. All Star Fresh kept entering the dance floors. The last titles mentioned were also popular worldwide, selling over 2.4 million copies. He didn't only work within projects like King Bee or Capella, but also was featuring well known production teams like Snap (I Got the Power). This teamwork resulted in the single Lets Get Busy (Clubland Quarts feat Snap  King Bee). This record ended up No. 1 in the Billboard Dance Charts (United States). Other productions in this line were Deepzone "It's Gonna Be All right", Kellee- my love, Ty Holden- you're my Inspiration and His Royal Freshness- They don't understand.

1990s
Urban Dance Squad was a Dutch rap rock band formed after a jam-session at a festival in Utrecht in 1986, including rapper/vocalist Rudeboy Remington and DJ DNA (DoNotAsk). The band's music is described as a blend of genres, including hard rock, funk, soul, hip hop, reggae, jazz and ska and is compared with Living Colour, Red Hot Chili Peppers and Fishbone. They are still known for their hit single Deeper Shade of Soul, which charted at number 21 in the United States on Billboard Hot 100.

In 1992, Osdorp Posse released their debut album Osdorp Stijl, making the first-ever Dutch language hip hop album. They started out translating N.W.A songs to Dutch, though later wrote their own rhymes in Dutch. Their beats, created by producer Seda on Amiga 500 with Protracker, have a familiar heavy sound and are similar to U.S. old-school hip hop. Frontman Def-P describes it as hardcore rap.

After the Osdorp Posse's first demo cassette, they toured around the Netherlands. In Deventer they found their first following, and the first Dutch language hip hop scene. The first hip hop groups after Osdorp Posse were Zuid-Oost Posse and Maasstraat Mannen. These groups performed all across the Netherlands. Maasstraat became famous as the first group combining reggae with Dutch lyrics, inspiring acts like Postmen, for example.

Rapper Extince, in 1995, took Dutch-language Nederhop to a new commercial level and audience. With two of his singles: Spraakwater and Kaal of Kammen becoming major hits in the mid-1990s, Extince was the first Dutch-language rapper to make the mainstream pop charts in the country. Spraakwater marked nothing short of a watershed, being not only the first Dutch rap to break in to the main Dutch Top 40 at all, but also making it into the top-10 – for mainstream radio listeners practically out of nowhere.

There were then two styles dominating the Dutch hip hop landscape: Extince combined easy flows and funky tunes into catchy songs full of references and metaphoric imagery, while hardcore performers like Westklan and Osdorp Posse marked their niche with more angry rhymes and harsh beats. A mix of these two styles gave birth to the Spookrijders, a three-man hip-hop group founded in 1996. With MCs Stefan and Clyde rapping about their personal lives and life in Amsterdam as a black man, the Spookrijders even gained respect from non-hip-hop musicians and fans. Most people admired the work of producer/DJ Cliff 'the Jazz' Nille after releasing Spookrijders debut album De Echte Shit ("The Real Shit"). In 1999, Spookrijders hit the charts twice with the hits "Klokkenluiders" and "Ik ben de man." Both these songs appeared on the second album, Klokkenluiders van Amsterdam. After some personal arguments among the three crewmembers, Spookrijders split up in 2003, after releasing a third and final album Hey... Spookies!!

In 1999 The Postmen released their rap/reggae mix De Bom ("The Bom"), a top three hit-single. They were active across Europe from 1998–2003.

2000s

From 2000 onward, Dutch language hiphop grew considerably, both in number of artists, as well as in popularity, both underground and mainstream.

In the early 2000s the MC fronted band Relax got much airplay, mainly impressing with their albums. Since 2002, they released four albums, the first three of which made the Dutch album top 40.

Def Rhymz, Spookrijders & Brainpower helped develop the art. Def Rhymz & Brainpower dropped multiple hit records. Described by Ali B. as "..a white library boy with glasses..", Brainpower made Dutch rapping accessible to a much greater demographic. With at least eight Top 100 album/EP projects Brainpower is one of the most successful Dutch MC's ever and remains a prolific bilingual lyricist (in Dutch & in English) to this day.

From the late 1990s, a flourishing underground scene in provincial town Zwolle included rappers Blaxtar, Jawat!, and Kubus, and centered around the group Opgezwolle. Formed in 1998 by rappers Sticky Steez and Phreaco Rico, together with DJ Delic, the band Opgezwolle (punning their town's name into "Swollen"), was a group making raw hiphop. They released three successful albums, in 2001, 2003, and 2006. Eigen Wereld ("Own World"), from 2006, achieved the highest notation of any Dutch-language rap album until then in the Dutch Album Top 100, reaching top 4.

In the same year, rapper Typhoon, also from Zwolle, and inspired by aforementioned peer Blaxtar, released his philosophical debut album Tussen Licht en Lucht ("Between Light and Air"). The successes of the Zwolle rappers crop boosted other Dutch artists' confidence and inspired them to be proud of their origins – whether local, foreign, or mixed. Rapper Typhoon pointed out, that band names of trailblazers like 'Osdorp Posse' and 'Opgezwolle' refer to their origins (Amsterdam Osdorp and Zwolle) for an important reason, and tied this to the shift from rapping in English to Dutch, making it more relatable and resonant with the audience. Instead of hard and angry, some 2000s releases stood out fragile and sensitive, for instance the single Je moest waarschijnlijk gaan ("I Guess You Had to Go"; 2001) by Brainpower, mourned the loss of his best friend; and the raps of Typhoon are called some of the most poetic.

Opgezwolle split up in 2007, but members Rico & Sticks formed a new group: Fakkelbrigade, with Typhoon, Mick 2dope Murray, MC James and beatmaker A.R.T. In 2009, they released the critically acclaimed album Colucci Era.

From 2003 through 2006, Lange Frans & Baas B had four top-three hits in the Dutch Top 40, beside three more listings. Zinloos, a sad commentary on senseless violence ("Zinloos Geweld"), and their patriotic yet introspective Het Land van .. ("The Land of..") gave the duo two number-1 hits, in 2004 and 2005 respectively.

In the mid-2000s Cilvaringz, Ali B. and Raymzter were also commercially successful. Ali B featured on other artists' tracks, most significantly with Marco Borsato on the song "Wat zou je doen?" for the charity War Child. He first achieved solo success with "Ik ben je zat", featuring Brace, in 2003. Together with music artist Akon, and Ali's cousin Yes-R, Ali B made an internationally successful remix of Akon's track Ghetto, including additional Dutch lyrics. Yes-R had six Dutch Top 40 hits from 2006–2012, including his debut single. Ali B. has sofar had fourteen Top 40 hit singles since 2003, including several top three listings.

In 2005, De Jeugd van Tegenwoordig ("Kids These Days") were successful with Watskeburt?! ("Wuzhappenin?!"). Rapper Jawat won the "Grote Prijs van Nederland" 2006.

Another Dutch hip-hop duo are Pete Philly and Perquisite who are already well known in the Netherlands, Germany, and in Japan.

A famous Dutch rapper outside the Netherlands is Salah Edin. His album Nederlands Grootste Nachtmerrie (Biggest Nightmare of the Netherlands) won Best Album Award in 2007 and was fully produced by Dr. Dre's right-hand man Focus... He also shot three of the most expensive music videos in the history of Dutch Hip Hop, and through a management deal with Cilvaringz, performed in 34 countries worldwide.

2010s
Social acceptance of rap / hip hop in the Netherlands was perhaps epitomized, when artist Typhoon performed for the Dutch royal family twice – both in 2013 and in 2016.

In 2015, a self-titled "New Wave" generation of 'social media' (em)powered artists broke through with their eponymous New Wave album, as a temporary collaboration, including Bokoesam, D-Double, Jonna Fraser, Lil' Kleine, Ronnie Flex, and SFB.

Since 2014, rappers Broederliefde released no less than seven albums, with the "worst one" topping at 13 in the charts — their debut reached nr. 3, and their last five albums were consecutive top-2s, with three of them topping the chart. Their third album, Hard Work Pays Off (II) (2016), broke an all-time record by staying at nr. 1 for 14 weeks, beating a 2003 12-week record, held by Dutch A-list singer Frans Bauer. Nine of their singles also charted in the singles Top 40.

In 2016, album WOP! by Lil' Kleine was the first hip-hop album to reach number 1 on the Album Top 100. In the same year, Ali B's third album, Een klein beetje geluk ("ALittle Bit of Happiness"), proved his best yet, reaching number 7.

Starting 2016, rapper Sevn Alias released five consecutive top-10 albums, with his second reaching nr. 1, and the last three consistently reaching top-2 positions. He is highly productive, and is also enjoying extensive success with singles, collaborations, and other track releases.

2020s

Conflicts
The Dutch hip-hop scene also saw many conflicts between rappers, followed by diss tracks. The following were among the biggest Dutch feuds in hip-hop:

Osdorp Posse vs. Extince, BrainPower vs. Extince, T.H.C vs. Negativ, Kempi vs. Nino, Yukkie B vs. Negativ, T.H.C. vs. Lexxxus, Baas B vs. Kimo, Kempi vs. Mini, Kempi vs. Bloedserieus, Heist Rockah vs. Negativ, and Regga vs. Lexxxus.

The feud between T.H.C. and Lexxxus resulted in a fistfight on a hip-hop event, when T.H.C. frontman Rocks got into an argument with Lexxxus and then started the fistfight.

Genres in Dutch hip hop

Gangsta
Dutch gangsta hip hop is currently a large scene together with underground hip-hop. Among the most notable groups are THC, Heinek'n, Keizer, Kempi, Steen, Hef, Crooks, Adonis and Negativ. The rhythms are influenced by the American rap scene, and the lyrics are often about crime, drugs, money, women and other criminal things.
Often coming from Dutch ghettos, lyrics often include themes occurring in these areas.
Dutch gangsta hip hop mostly comes from the five largest cities: Amsterdam, Rotterdam, The Hague, Utrecht and Eindhoven.

Commercial success
The commercial success of Dutch hip hop is largely made by Brainpower, Yes-R, Ali B, Lange Frans & Baas B and Extince. For a large part of the Dutch hip hop community Yes-R, Ali B and Lange Frans & Baas B are sometimes considered fake because they do a lot of work for children TV stations. Brainpower and Extince however both enjoy a great respect for bringing up hip hop in their native Dutch. Other commercial rappers are De Jeugd van Tegenwoordig, and one of the more popular artists in the Netherlands, Partysquad or The Partysquad. They are a 2-man group, having had success with hits such as "Stuk" (Broken), and "Dat is Die Shit" (That's the shit), with other popular songs in the background such as "Non Stop" ft. Brainpower, "We Gaan Los" (we're going crazy {because of highness or drunkenness}) with Kempi, and "Wat Wil Je Doen" (What do you want to do?).

Dutch oldskool
The Dutch oldskool exists out of three primary artists, LTH, Osdorp Posse, Extince, Sugacane and Duvelduvel. Osdorp Posse make to what they themselves call hardcore rap and use beats that have much in common with N.W.A. Their lyrics are about racism, prostitution (not always negatively), police and other social subjects. Extince uses very different, more funky kind of beats than Osdorp Posse and uses a completely different rapstyle. Duvelduvel is known as a conceptual hip hop group.

Notable artists
Notable Dutch hip hop artists, listed by locality include:

See also 
 European hip hop

References

External links 
 Nederhop Video – Categorized video clips of Dutch-language rappers
 Nederhop Radio
 Rap beats from Dutch producer Marcel van Ling (MoSound Productions)
 Rap Hiphop beats from Dutch producer
 Best Hip Hop duo in Amsterdam right now!
 Het VerZet - Hip-hop crew